is a Japanese LGBT activist, stage actress and writer. From 2005 to 2006 she was an otokoyaku member of the Takarazuka Revue Hana-gumi under the name . From the fall of 2010 she became involved in LGBT issues.

Early life
Higashi was born in Kanazawa, Ishikawa Prefecture. After enrolling in Hokuriku Gakuin Junior and Senior High School she entered Takarazuka Music College. In 2005 she became the 91st generation student of the Takarazuka Revue Company. Later in the year, Higashi debuted in the Hanagumi stage Marrakech Kurenai no Bohyō / Enter the Review. Later on she, with seven other members including Sumika Nono, joined Hanagumi, she later left Takarazuka in 2006, and stopped her entertainment activities.

In the autumn of 2010, Higashi started supporting LGBT activities with her real name. She established that she was a lesbian and later announced to the Takarazuka Revue Company as Aura Maki at the same time. In December 2011, Higashi launched "Rainbow Kanazawa", and became a representative until April 2013. In March 2011, she became a staff member of teenager events "Onna no Ko" ga Sukina "Onna no Ko" no tame no Tomodachi-zukuri Event and Peer Friends for girls until July 2014. In January 2014, Higashi wrote the manga Lesbian-teki Kekkon Seikatsu (co-written with her wife Hiroko Masuhara, and illustrated by Emiko Sugiyama), later in June she wrote Nakatta koto ni shitakunai – Jippu kara Sei Gyakutai o Uketa Watashi no Kokuhaku ("I do not want to make it not – I confessed my sexual abuse from my father") by herself, in which she started writing in earnest. Currently, she appeared in LGBT and sexual abuse-related television programmes and lectures apart from writing. In addition, she presented in Makimū & Koyutan no Lesbian Channel in Niconico's live broadcast with lesbian tarento Asako Makimura, Higashi also presented Koyutan no Suiyōbi in which it broadcasts on the theme of LGBT enlightenment and events related to the LGBT community.

Her same-sex wedding at Tokyo Disney Resort
In March 2012, Tokyo Disney Resort announced the plan "Disney Royal Dream Wedding" in which the Cinderella Castle opens wedding ceremonies for ordinary guests in the park. Upon this, Higashi contacted the resort to have a same-sex wedding, although the  use of same-sex was said to be satisfactory, due to the "influence on ordinary customers", they answered that either one had to wear a tuxedo (the men's costume). When it was sent in Twitter, the critical response to Disney's response has expanded. Then, the Tokyo Disney Resort confirmed with The Walt Disney Company in the United States, Higashi withdrew her previous answer and said that a "wedding with the same sex is possible", and publicly announced that it was not a special case and that weddings by same-sex couples can also be admitted at Tokyo Disneyland. The couple announced that "Disney will fulfill their dreams again" and their voice of joy rises, Higashi and her partner later visited Tokyo Disneyland to express their gratitude. The incident became "one of the major movements representing 2012 for the (LGBT) community", in the same year Higashi and her partner received the Tokyo SuperStar Awards Community Award in which it recognizes people or organizations that contributed to the development of the LGBT culture or community. Later on 1 March 2013, Higashi cited the ceremony at Tokyo DisneySea, and became the first couple who made the same-sex wedding ceremony at Disney Resort in Japan.

"Partnership Certificate" in Shibuya
Tokyo's Shibuya Ward is the first Japanese municipality that decided to issue "partnership certificates" to same-sex couples, after its assembly voted in favour of an ordinance containing this policy on the 31st of March 2015. Applications for these certificates started on the 28th of October of the same year. Higashi and her partner applied for the certificate and on the 5th of November they became the first couple to receive such a certificate from a Japanese municipality. While the policy of LGBT partnership systems has been spreading across Japan and hundreds of other couples have followed in Higashi's footsteps, she and her partner have since split up and returned their partnership certificate to Shibuya Ward.

Bibliography

References

Notes

Sources

External links
  

Japanese LGBT rights activists
Japanese lesbian actresses
Lesbian writers
Japanese stage actresses
People from Kanazawa, Ishikawa
Living people
1985 births
Child sexual abuse in Japan
Actors from Ishikawa Prefecture
People from Ishikawa Prefecture
Writers from Ishikawa Prefecture